Piero Torrigiani (1 June 1846 – 16 June 1920) was an Italian politician. He was born in Florence. He served as mayor of his hometown twice. He was a recipient of the Order of Saints Maurice and Lazarus and the Order of the Crown of Italy.

See also
 List of Italians

References

External links
 
 

1846 births
1920 deaths
19th-century Italian politicians
Mayors of Florence